Amanita elongata or Peck's yellow dust amanita is a species of Amanita from Northeastern United States and Canada.

References

External links
 
 

elongata